Weeneebayko Area Health Authority Paramedic Services (WAHA-PS) - formerly James Bay Ambulance Services - services First Nation communities in Northern Ontario and is funded by the province of Ontario. 

WAHA-PS services the communities and transfers to the nearest airport/helipad for advance care in the south by ORNGE.

Dispatch services are routed via Timmins Central Ambulance Communications Centre.

Stations

WAHA-PS operates from 6 stations:

 Moosonee, Ontario - located at Fifth Street and Bay Road
 Attawapiskat, Ontario - east of the hospital site
 Fort Albany, Ontario - School Road and Main Road
 Peawanuck, Ontario
 Kashechewan, Ontario - at Base 4
 Moose Factory, Ontario -  Emergency Preparedness and Response (EPR) Centre shared with Moose Factory Island Fire & Rescue and Nishnawbe Aski Police Service.

Fleet

WAHA-PS operates Type II ambulances.

References

Ambulance services in Canada
Emergency medical services in Canada